Bad Girls Club: Back for More is the fourteenth season of the Oxygen reality television series Bad Girls Club. It premiered on August 11, 2015 and concluded on November 3, 2015. This is the seventh edition of Bad Girls Club to film in Los Angeles. Life coach Laura Baron returns for a third season.

Cast

Original Bad Girls

Replacement Bad Girls

Duration of Cast

Episodes

Notes

References

External links
 

2015 American television seasons
Bad Girls Club seasons
Television shows set in Los Angeles